Naharlagun–Guwahati Shatabdi Express is a Shatabdi Express category type of service belonging to Northeast Frontier Railway zone that runs between  and  in India.

It operates as train number 12087 from Naharlagun to Guwahati and as train number 12088 in the reverse direction, serving the states of Assam and Arunachal Pradesh.

Coaches

The 12085/ 86 Naharlagun–Guwahati Shatabdi Express presently has 6 AC Chair Car & 2 End-on Generator coaches. It does not carry a pantry car but being a Shatabdi-category train, catering is arranged on board the train.

As is customary with most train services in India, coach composition may be amended at the discretion of Indian Railways depending on demand.

Service

The 12087 / 12088 Naharlagun–Guwahati Shatabdi Express covers the distance of 332 kilometres in 06 hours 00 mins in both directions.

The average speed of the train is 55 km/hr.

Routing

The 12087 / 88 Naharlagun–Guwahati Shatabdi Express runs from Naharlagun via ,  to Guwahati.

Being a Shatabdi-class train, it returns to its originating station Naharlagun on next day and also it shares rakes with 12085/86 Guwahati–Dibrugarh Shatabdi Express

References

External links
 12087 Shatabdi Express at India Rail Info
 12088 Shatabdi Express at India Rail Info

Shatabdi Express trains
Rail transport in Assam
Rail transport in Arunachal Pradesh
Transport in Guwahati
Transport in Itanagar